A Series of Unfortunate Events is an American black comedy drama streaming television series based on the book series of the same name by Lemony Snicket (the pen name of American author Daniel Handler) for Netflix. It stars Neil Patrick Harris, Patrick Warburton, Malina Weissman, Louis Hynes, K. Todd Freeman, and Presley Smith. Dylan Kingwell, Avi Lake, and Lucy Punch join the cast in the second season.

Similar to the book series, A Series of Unfortunate Events follows the misadventures of the three Baudelaire children, Violet, Klaus, and Sunny, following the deaths of their parents and the destruction of their home. While the children are shuffled between various foster homes, they are pursued by Count Olaf, who desires to gain control of the vast Baudelaire inheritance before Violet comes of age. Along the way, the Baudelaires discover their parents' connections to an elusive secret society.

The first season, which premiered on January 13, 2017, consists of eight episodes and adapts the first four books of the series. The second season was ordered in March 2017 and released on March 30, 2018, consisting of ten episodes and adapting the fifth through the ninth books. The third and final season, which was announced in April 2017 and released on January 1, 2019, consists of seven episodes and adapts the remaining four books.

Throughout its run, the series received critical acclaim, with praise towards its production values, writing, faithfulness to the novels, and acting, particularly that of Harris as Count Olaf.

Premise
When a mysterious fire destroys their home and kills their parents, the Baudelaire children, Violet, Klaus and Sunny, are placed in the care of their distant 'relative' Count Olaf, an actor who is determined to claim the family fortune for himself. Following Olaf's failed attempt at getting the Baudelaires' fortune and his plot being exposed, the Baudelaires are placed in the custody of a series of inept or unsympathetic guardians, as they try to elude Olaf and his followers and uncover the mystery behind a secret society from their parents' past. The mysterious and melancholic Lemony Snicket narrates the Baudelaires' adventures for the audience.

Cast and characters

Main

 Neil Patrick Harris as Count Olaf, a failing actor who is determined to claim the Baudelaire fortune for himself. He is a member of the fire-starting side of the secret organization VFD (Volunteer Fire Department). He has a unibrow and a tattoo resembling an eye on his left ankle, which is frequently used to identify him when he is disguised.
 Patrick Warburton as Lemony Snicket, the narrator and member of VFD who is tasked with explaining the events during the lives of the Baudelaires.
 Malina Weissman as Violet Baudelaire, the eldest Baudelaire sibling, an inventor and talented mechanic.
 Louis Hynes as Klaus Baudelaire, the middle Baudelaire child, interested in literature and books.
 K. Todd Freeman as Arthur Poe, the family banker at Mulctuary Money Management and executor of the Baudelaire parents' estate, who is in charge of placing the Baudelaires in the care of a suitable guardian. He is often seen to be oblivious to the crimes around him despite the Baudelaire siblings telling him.
 Presley Smith as Sunny Baudelaire, the infant Baudelaire child with unnaturally strong teeth and eventually a love for cooking. Tara Strong provides Sunny's babbling sound effects, the meaning of which is often translated in subtitles. Smith's own voice was also used within the third season.
 Lucy Punch as Esmé Squalor, a glamorous, wealthy financial advisor, who becomes an ally and love interest for Count Olaf. (seasons 2–3)
 Dylan Kingwell as Duncan and Quigley Quagmire, Isadora's brothers. Duncan is a keen journalist, while Quigley is Isadora and Duncan's long lost sibling who was thought dead in the fire at the Quagmire home. (guest season 1; main seasons 2–3)
 Avi Lake as Isadora Quagmire, Duncan and Quigley's sister who loves writing poetry. (main season 2; guest seasons 1 & 3)

Recurring

 Will Arnett as the Quagmires' father, a man associated with VFD who is trying to return home to his children.
 Cobie Smulders as the Quagmires' mother, a woman associated with VFD who is trying to return home to her children.
 Usman Ally as Fernald the Hook-Handed Man, a member of Count Olaf's theatre troupe with hooks instead of hands.
 Matty Cardarople as the Henchperson of Indeterminate Gender, a member of Count Olaf's theatre troupe who doesn't have a specific gender.
 Cleo King as Eleanora Poe, Arthur Poe's wife and the editor-in-chief of The Daily Punctilio who loves pursuing sensationalist headlines.
 John DeSantis as the Bald Man, a tall bald-headed man who is another member of Count Olaf's theatre troupe.
 Jacqueline and Joyce Robbins as the White-Faced Women, two elderly twins who are members of Count Olaf's theatre troupe.
 Sara Canning as Jacquelyn Scieszka, Mr. Poe's standoffish secretary and a member of VFD. She possesses a spyglass.
 Patrick Breen as Larry Your-Waiter, a member of VFD who is seen working as a waiter at various establishments the Baudelaires visit including the Anxious Clown, Prufrock Preparatory's cafeteria, Café Salmonella, and the Hotel Denouement's Indian restaurant.
 Sara Rue as Olivia Caliban, a librarian at Prufrock Preparatory School who later enlists as a member of VFD when she becomes invested in the Baudelaires' plight and even becomes the latest Madame Lulu.
 Nathan Fillion as Jacques Snicket, the dashing adventurer brother of Lemony Snicket and member of VFD who enlists Olivia Caliban to help the Baudelaires.
 Kitana Turnbull as Carmelita Spats, an obnoxious, tutu-wearing student at Prufrock Preparatory School. She later becomes Olaf and Esmé's adoptive daughter.
 Allison Williams as Kit Snicket, the sister of Lemony and Jacques Snicket, member of VFD, and Count Olaf's former fiancée.

Guest

Introduced in season 1

 Joan Cusack as Justice Strauss, a judge and Count Olaf's neighbor who helps the Baudelaires and hopes to adopt them.
 Kaniel Jacob-Cross and Jack Forrester as Edgar and Albert Poe, Arthur Poe's two sons who are unwelcoming to the Baudelaires.
 Darcey Johnson as Trolleyman, the driver of a rickety trolley.
 Luke Camilleri as Gustav Sebald, a member of V.F.D. and Monty's former assistant who made some films that had certain codes in it.
 Aasif Mandvi as Montgomery "Uncle Monty" Montgomery, a distant relative of the Baudelaires and enthusiastic herpetologist who claims to have spent his childhood with their late parents. He is a member of V.F.D. and possesses a V.F.D spyglass.
 Matthew Walker as the Ticket Seller, an unnamed Ticket Seller at Tedia's movie theater who is a friend of Montgomery and a member of V.F.D. Mark Kandborg portrays him in a flashback seen in "Carnivorous Carnival".
 Alfre Woodard as Aunt Josephine Anwhistle, a distant relative of the Baudelaires at Lake Lachrymose who has many rational and irrational fears since the loss of her husband Ike and a love of grammar. She is a member of V.F.D.
 Barry Sonnenfeld as Ike Anwhistle, the late husband of Josephine who is first seen as a picture cameo in "The Wide Window" and appears in person in a flashback scene in "Carnivorous Carnival" as a member of V.F.D.
 Rob LaBelle as a taxi driver.
 Don Johnson as Sir, the cigar-smoking owner of Lucky Smells Lumbermill.
 Catherine O'Hara as Georgina Orwell, an optometrist, member of the fire-starting side of V.F.D., and Count Olaf's ex-girlfriend who hypnotizes the Lucky Smells Lumbermill workers so they never leave, also causing them to believe the Baudelaire parents set fire to Paltryville. O'Hara previously portrayed Justice Strauss in the 2004 film adaptation.
 Rhys Darby as Charles, Sir's partner who is friendly towards the Baudelaires.
 Timothy Webber as Jimmy, a worker at Lucky Smells Lumbermill.
 Chris Gauthier as Phil, an optimistic worker who befriends the Baudelaires during their stay at the Lucky Smells Lumbermill. He later reunites with the Baudelaires as the cook on the Queequeg submarine.
 Loretta Walsh as Norma Rae, a worker at Lucky Smells Lumbermill.
 Trent Redekop as Cesar, a worker at Lucky Smells Lumbermill.

Daniel Handler cameos as a fish salesperson at Lake Lachrymose.

Introduced in season 2

 Roger Bart as Nero Feint, the violin-playing vice-principal of Prufrock Preparatory School and struggling musician with an egotistic personality, a penchant for mimicking what someone says in a high voice, and a love for excessive punishments.
 Bronwen Smith as Miss Tench, Prufrock Preparatory School's gym teacher who is replaced in the post by a disguised Count Olaf while on her way back to Prufrock Preparatory School with the pep squad and the sports team.
 Malcolm Stewart as Mr. Remora, a teacher at Prufrock Preparatory School who specializes in teaching his personal anecdotes and is always seen eating a banana.
 BJ Harrison as Mrs. Bass, a teacher at Prufrock Preparatory School who specializes in measuring objects. She later becomes a bank robber.
 Tony Hale as Jerome Squalor, the timid husband of Esmé Squalor.
 Sage Brocklebank as Doorman, an unnamed doorman who works at 667 Dark Avenue.
 Ithamar Enriquez as Hector, a skittish handyman and citizen of the Village of Fowl Devotees who befriends the Baudelaires.
 Mindy Sterling as Elder Anabelle, a member of the Village of Fowl Devotees' Council of Elders who often quotes "silence" when a non-police officer and/or a non-banker consultant attempts to violate the "No one may talk while on the platform" rule.
 Carol Mansell as Elder Jemma, a soft-spoken member of the Village of Fowl Devotees' Council of Elders.
 Ken Jenkins as Elder Sam, a gruff-speaking member of the Village of Fowl Devotees' Council of Elders.
 Lossen Chambers as Mrs. Morrow, an inhabitant of the Village of Fowl Devotees that wears a pink robe.
 Kevin Chamberlin as Mr. Lesko, an inhabitant of the Village of Fowl Devotees that wears plaid pants.
 Serge Houde as Milt, the shopkeeper of the Last Chance General Store in the Hinterlands.
 Gabe Khouth as Lou, the newspaper delivery boy who brings the Daily Punctilio's newspapers to the Last Chance General Store.
 John Bobek as the bearded leader of the Volunteers Fighting Disease.
 Lauren McGibbon as the perky member of the Volunteers Fighting Disease.
 Kerri Kenney-Silver as Babs, the Head of Human Resources, Hospital Administration and party-planning at Heimlich Hospital.
 David Alan Grier as Hal, a visually-disabled file clerk who is employed in the Library of Records at Heimlich Hospital.
 Robbie Amell as Kevin, an ambidextrous "freak" who works at Caligari Carnival.
 Kevin Cahoon as Hugo, a hunchbacked "freak" who works at Caligari Carnival.
 Bonnie Morgan as Colette, a contortionist "freak" who works at Caligari Carnival.
 David Burtka as Mr. Willums, a heckler with a pimpled chin who attends Caligari Carnival. He is based on The Man With Pimples On His Chin from "The Carnivorous Carnival" book.
 Jill Morrison as Mrs. Willums, the wife of Mr. Willums.
 Harper and Gideon Burtka-Harris as Trixie and Skip Willums, the children of Mr. Willums.

Introduced in season 3

 Keegan Connor Tracy as Brucie, the leader of the Snow Scouts who is based on Bruce from the book series.
 Richard E. Grant as the Man with a Beard but No Hair, a villain and associate of Count Olaf who has an "aura of menace" that even frightens Count Olaf.
 Beth Grant as the Woman with Hair but No Beard, a villain and associate of Count Olaf who has an "aura of menace" that even frightens Count Olaf.
 Kassius Nelson as Fiona Widdershins, the teenage captain of the Queequeg and Klaus' love interest who is looking for her stepfather Captain Widdershins ever since he was lost at sea. She is revealed to be the sister of Fernald.
 Max Greenfield as the Denouement brothers, triplets who are members of V.F.D. and work at the Hotel Denouement. Dewey is the sub-sub-librarian of the Hotel Denouement and lover of Kit Snicket who the Baudelaires encounter. Frank and Ernest are the co-managers of the Hotel Denouement. Frank is described as the good brother on the fire-fighting side of V.F.D. and Ernest is described as the villainous brother on V.F.D's fire-starting side with connections with Count Olaf.
 Morena Baccarin as Beatrice Baudelaire, the mother of the Baudelaire children.
 Eric Keenleyside as the Fire Chief, the unnamed father of Count Olaf and chief of the city's fire department who was accidentally killed by Beatrice with a poison dart that was meant for Esmé.
 Peter MacNicol as Ishmael, the leader of a group of castaways on an island and the founder of V.F.D. who left when the "Schism" began. In the show, he is also the estranged principal of Prufrock Preparatory School.
 Nakai Takawira as Friday, a young girl living on an island.
 Angela Moore as Miranda, the mother of Friday who lives on an island.
 Simon Chin as Alonso, an inhabitant on an island.
 Matthew James Dowden as Bertrand Baudelaire, the father of the Baudelaire children.
 Angelina Capozzoli as Beatrice Baudelaire II, the daughter of Kit Snicket and Dewey Denouement who is taken in by the Baudelaire children and later reunites with her uncle Lemony.

Episodes

Season 1 (2017)
The first season adapts the first four books of the novel series: The Bad Beginning, The Reptile Room, The Wide Window and The Miserable Mill.

Season 2 (2018)
The second season adapts books five through nine of the novel series: The Austere Academy, The Ersatz Elevator, The Vile Village, The Hostile Hospital, and The Carnivorous Carnival.

Season 3 (2019)
The third and final season adapts the final four books of the novel series in seven episodes: The Slippery Slope, The Grim Grotto, The Penultimate Peril, and The End, with the final book being adapted as a single episode.

Production

Development 
The thirteen A Series of Unfortunate Events novels, written by Daniel Handler under the pen name Lemony Snicket from 1999 to 2006, achieved success in young adult fiction around the same time as the Harry Potter novels. As such, the Snicket books had been optioned to be filmed before they were published. This led to the development of a 2004 feature film, Lemony Snicket's A Series of Unfortunate Events, which covered the narratives of the first three novels in the series. Barry Sonnenfeld, who has expressed his love for the series, was originally slated to direct the feature film and had hired Handler to write the screenplay. About 10 months into production, shortly after the casting of Jim Carrey as Olaf, there was a "big crisis", according to Handler, which caused producer Scott Rudin to walk away and Sonnenfeld left the production under unclear terms. With the film's completion in flux, its producing studios Paramount Pictures and DreamWorks fired Handler. While the film was eventually completed and released, sequels which would adapt the other novels in the series became unlikely due to "corporate shakeups" within DreamWorks, according to Handler, and the child actors that portrayed the Baudelaire children grew too old to star in a sequel.

Both Sonnenfeld and Handler still wanted to see the series fully fleshed out in a visual format, and with the onset of streaming television, believed this was a better method of presenting the series. Sonnenfeld approached Netflix with the idea, stressing that he wanted to make the series far less overproduced compared to the feature film, instead of having the entire show able to be shot on stage in a dry and flat manner, and without having to hide any of the darker scenes such as character deaths. Netflix agreed, and in November 2014, publicly announced plans to adapt the book series into a television series in association with Paramount Television. Handler was named the series' executive producer. By September 2015, Netflix announced that Sonnenfeld's involvement as both director and executive producer, as well as Mark Hudis as showrunner, and Handler writing some of the scripts along with working with the series' writing team. However, in January 2016, Netflix announced that Hudis had left the project, with a replacement showrunner not named at the time.

The first season consists of eight episodes, with two episodes adapting each of the first four books of the series. Handler considered this more in line with how he had written the books in the manner of a serialized melodrama, citing The Perils of Pauline as one of his influences in writing the book series. In January 2017, Handler revealed that he was writing the series' second season, to consist of ten episodes adapting the fifth through ninth books of the series. A third season would adapt the remaining novels of the series, which Handler hoped "to get the go-ahead to do" since "given how quickly young actors age and change, we're trying to film everything as quickly as possible". In March 2017, Netflix revealed the series had been renewed for a second season by releasing a video on their social media pointing to a viral marketing website, where a letter written by Snicket revealed the decision. A month later, the series was "quietly" renewed for a third season, which Harris confirmed would be the final one for the series. While the screenplays were written by Handler otherwise stay in concert with the books, Handler did add a new conclusion to the work that he felt gave some proper closure in an organic manner that otherwise did not take away from the series.

Casting 

On December 3, 2015, an open casting call was announced for the roles of Violet and Klaus Baudelaire. Sonnenfeld had worked with Malina Weissman before on the film Nine Lives and had appreciated her ability to speak quickly without overacting, and selected her for Violet from her audition. They had more difficulty in landing an actor for Klaus, but Louis Hynes, who had no professional acting prior, had submitted a promising audition video. Casting flew Hynes from London to Los Angeles while in the middle of set production, and after about an hour of testing with Weissman, Hynes was selected as Klaus as a last-minute option. Both were announced by January 2016.

Handler had first considered Neil Patrick Harris for the role of Count Olaf after seeing him perform the opening number "It's Not Just for Gays Anymore", at the 65th Tony Awards in 2011, noting "I just immediately saw someone who could pull off a million things at once" as was necessary for the character of Olaf, who utilizes various disguises and accents in his quest to steal the Baudelaire fortune. Sonnenfeld also felt Harris had done enough work on both stage, screen, and film to handle the breadth of characterization that Olaf displayed over the course of the book series. Sonnenfeld had previously met Harris over Thanksgiving 2015, prior to Sonnenfeld being confirmed for the project. Sonnenfeld hinted to Harris about the potential role, and once Netflix hired Sonnenfeld, proceeded to offer him the role. In January 2016, Netflix announced that Harris had been cast as Count Olaf.

One of the key changes that Sonnenfeld and Handler wanted for the series was to make Lemony Snicket a more visible character narrating on adventures of the Baudelaires children from their relative future, allowing him to be in scenes without actually being part of the events. Casting Patrick Warburton for Lemony was Handler's idea, despite Sonnenfeld having worked with Warburton in several previous productions. Handler felt Warburton was an actor that can deliver comedic lines without being too obvious about it, as well as bringing the emotional breadth that the character needed to show. Warburton's casting was confirmed by March 2016.

It was also revealed that Presley Smith would play Sunny Baudelaire, whose quasi-nonsensical lines are voiced by Tara Strong. The casting department had initially sought a set of twin infants for the role, a standard practice to avoid complications from weariness during filming. None of those auditioned had the look that they felt was appropriate for the part. Smith however, had both the personality and look they felt appropriate for Sunny, and took the risk of casting a single actor for the role.

Other casting included: in March 2016, K. Todd Freeman was cast as Mr. Poe, and Aasif Mandvi as Uncle Monty. In September 2016, it was revealed that Dylan Kingwell and Avi Lake were cast as the Quagmire siblings, Duncan and Isadora, respectively. In November 2016, Handler revealed Catherine O'Hara, Don Johnson, and Alfre Woodard had been cast as Dr. Georgina Orwell, Sir, and Aunt Josephine, respectively; O'Hara had previously portrayed Justice Strauss in the 2004 film adaptation of A Series of Unfortunate Events. Rhys Darby would play Charles, Sir's partner.

Filming 
Production began in May 2016 in Vancouver, British Columbia, and in August 2016 several cast members expressed through social media that filming had finished. Filming for the second season began in April 2017. The third season began filming on January 5, 2018.

One aspect of the series of books that the production team wanted to be captured in the series was the notion of a lack of specific time period or geography for the settings; Handler stated that he wrote enough for establishing set pieces, but purposely left more specific details vague "in order for young readers to fill in the blanks themselves". Sonnenfeld wanted to capture that same sense of ambiguous time and place, and he and his team worked to try to define a set of subjective rules of what elements could be included. Sonnenfeld brought on Bo Welch, production designer for Edward Scissorhands, which Handler considered to capture the same sense of a "familiar but completely imaginary" suburban setting he had in mind for his books. While the production team used computer-generated imagery where needed, they attempted to avoid this use where possible, such as by using large painted backdrops, by key scenic artist John E. Wilcox, rather than employing green screen filming.

Music 
In April 2016, Nick Urata was initially reported to be composing music for the series. Once the first season was released, it was revealed that Urata collaborated with Daniel Handler to compose the main title theme, "Look Away", as well as various original songs that appear throughout the series, with Handler contributing the lyrics. The first season's original score was composed by James Newton Howard, with his frequent collaborators Sven Faulconer and Chris Bacon filling in to score certain episodes. In the second season, Jim Dooley joined the production as a composer and subsequently wrote the music for eight of the season's ten episodes and the rest of season 3, with Nick Urata to compose the second season's first two episodes.

"Look Away", the theme song for the opening titles of the series, is performed by Neil Patrick Harris. In keeping with the tone of the book series, the song warns the viewer against continuing to watch the unpleasant story any further. The lyrics of the middle part of the song change for each pair of episodes, comprising a brief synopsis of those episodes' premise.

Visual effects 
Zoic Studios created visual effects for the series, including the effects for many of Sunny Baudelaire's actions. Tippett Studio also did work on the series, including the effects for the destruction of Josephine's house, landscape shots of Lake Lachrymose and some of the more movement heavy Sunny Baudelaire shots.

Release
All eight episodes of the first season of A Series of Unfortunate Events were released worldwide on Netflix on January 13, 2017, in Ultra HD 4K. The second season was released on March 30, 2018. The third season was released on January 1, 2019.

Marketing 
On July 5, 2015, a video titled "An Unfortunate Teaser" was uploaded to YouTube by a user named "Eleanora Poe". Netflix quickly released a statement saying "This was not released from Netflix." Media outlets were almost unanimous in agreement that the trailer was fan-made. However, Caitlin Petrakovitz of CNET argued that the trailer may be real and that Netflix's carefully worded denial was a marketing campaign, noting the user name "Eleanora Poe" being the same as a character from the series, and that a shellac record seen in the trailer was of The Gothic Archies, a band who provided the theme music for the audio books of A Series of Unfortunate Events. The trailer was later revealed to be a spec promo, similar to a spec script, by an independent commercial director, whom Netflix contracted to make a title sequence for the series after the video's popularity, though they did not go ahead with the concept.

In October 2016, Netflix released the first teaser trailer for A Series of Unfortunate Events, where Warburton narrates the events of the series as Lemony Snicket. A trailer, featuring footage from the series and Neil Patrick Harris's character, Count Olaf, was released by Netflix in November 2016, followed shortly by the first full trailer. The second trailer was released in December 2016, followed by a "holiday-themed" trailer from Count Olaf leading fans to a viral marketing website for the fictional Valorous Farms Dairy, which featured four holiday e-cards for download.

As part of the marketing for the third season, Netflix released a YouTube trailer of Count Olaf and Lemony Snicket on November 13, 2018 giving alternative accounts of the events of the previous seasons, with the former describing them as a series of "learning experiences" and the latter as a "series of unfortunate events". On December 10, Netflix released a second YouTube trailer, featuring Allison Williams as Kit Snicket and introducing Richard E. Grant as the villainous "Man with a Beard but No Hair" and Beth Grant as the villainous "Woman with Hair but No Beard".

Reception

Audience viewership 
At the time of the series release, Netflix did not reveal subscriber viewership numbers for any of their original series. Symphony Technology Group compiled data for the first season based on people using software on their devices that measure television viewing by detecting a program's sound. According to Symphony, 3.755 million viewers aged 18–49 within the United States were watching an episode of A Series of Unfortunate Events over the average minute in its first weekend of release.

Critical response

Season 1 
The first season of A Series of Unfortunate Events received critical acclaim. Review aggregator Rotten Tomatoes gives the season an approval rating of 94% based on 69 reviews, with an average rating of 8.06/10. The site's critical consensus reads, "Enjoyably dark, A Series of Unfortunate Events matches the source material's narrative as well as its tone, leaving viewers with a wonderfully weird, dry, gothic comedy." On Metacritic the season has a score of 81 out of 100, based on 24 critics, indicating "universal acclaim".

Erik Adams of The A.V. Club awarded the season a B and praised it for treating "mature themes like grief, loss, and disappointment with sardonic honesty". Adams compared the program positively to the Adam West Batman series, calling it "kids stuff with adult sophistication, driven by two-part stories, outrageous visuals, and the scenery-chewing of big-name guest stars". Ben Travers of Indiewire gave the series an A−, saying that it "proves as inspirational and endearing as it claims to be forlorn and heartbreaking". Brian Lowry of CNN praised the showrunners for "infusing the show with a lemony-fresh feel, conjuring a series similar to the fantastical tone of Pushing Daisies". Lowry wrote that "the show proves a good deal of fun" and that "Harris dives into his over-the-top character with considerable gusto." He also argued that the series improved upon the 2004 film.

Several critics praised the television series as a better adaptation of the books than the 2004 feature film, which starred Jim Carrey as Count Olaf. Kelly Lawler of USA Today felt the television format gave the stories more room to develop, the addition of Warburton as the fourth wall-breaking Snicket helped to convey some of the wordplay humor used in the books, and Harris's portrayal of Olaf was "much more dynamic, and creepier" than Carrey's version. The Verge Chaim Gartenburg said that the show follows the books much more faithfully than the film, and "nails down the tone that made the stories so special". Los Angeles Times writer Robert Lloyd felt that the backgrounds of Sonnenfeld and Welch made them "the right people for this job, set in a milieu that is hard to fix in time, except to say it is not now", in capturing the tones of the book compared to the feature film.

Nick Allen of RogerEbert.com, on the other hand, gave the series a negative review, calling it "an unfunny parody of sadness" that is "never as clever as it wants to be" and would only appeal to fans of the books. Caroline Framke of Vox Media praised the series for its unique and weird visuals, but found the show's tone, pacing and performances to be haphazard and considered the show to be "literally, a series of unfortunate events".

Season 2 
As with the first season, the second season received critical acclaim. Review aggregator Rotten Tomatoes gives the second season an approval rating of 94% based on 16 reviews, with an average rating of 7.81/10. The site's critical consensus reads: "Season two of A Series of Unfortunate Events is as gothic, twisted and absurd as the first, to the delight of moody tweens of all ages." Clarisse Loughrey of The Independent praised the show as one that "essentially deals with thoughtful, intelligent young people battling to speak up against an illogical world." While observing that the "show may revel in the miserable", she opined "that the purpose of its own morbidity is to offer the assurance that hope lives in even the darkest of places." Loughrey also credited the show's expanded storyline for the Baudelaires' adult allies for "plumping up" the episodes' narrative arcs and deepening the show's emotional impact.

Tristram Fane Saunders of The Telegraph awarded the second season four out of five stars. He described the show as a "gothic treat [that] also offers a wicked line in absurdist humour, and the most gorgeously toybox-like set designs you'll find anywhere outside a Wes Anderson film". Radio Times reviewer Huw Fullerton praised the series for its faithfulness to the original novels. While praising the improved CGI used to make Presley Smith's character Sunny Baudelaire react better to situations, he criticized the addition of supporting "good" characters such as Nathan Fillion's Jacques Snicket and Sara Canning's Jacquelyn for "undercutting the bleakness and loneliness that characterized the novels".

Rohan Naahar of the Hindustan Times described A Series of Unfortunate Events as "one of the most lavish originals in Netflix's bottomless catalogue, created by fans, for fans". He also praised Neil Patrick Harris's performance as Count Olaf. The Den of Geek reviewer Michael Ahr praised tortoise-shell '' and stone marimbas score for giving the television series its primal sound. IGN reviewer Jonathon Dornbush criticized the second season's formulaic plot structure and lack of the insightful observations compared to the first season. He also praised several of the second season's episodes particularly "The Ersatz Elevator", "The Hostile Hospital", and "The Carnivorous Carnival" for smartly twisting the story formula and deepening the novel series' mythology. Dornbush also praised the performance of Lucy Punch and Patrick Warburton and awarded the second season 7.2 stars.

Season 3 
As with the previous seasons, the third season received critical acclaim, with the season receiving a 100% rating on Rotten Tomatoes based on 15 reviews and an average rating of 8.43/10. The site's critical consensus reads: "The final installment of Lemony Snicket's magnum opus adds new contours to its expansive cast, provides answers to some of the pernicious questions within the series' lore, and delivers a finale that is more graceful than unfortunate." Jonathan Dornbrush of IGN praised the third season for bringing "an emotionally satisfying ending to its macabre tale"; awarding it 8.7 out of 10. He also praised the series for deepening the characterizations of the Baudelaires, Lemony Snicket, and Count Olaf and skillfully incorporating the source material. Samantha Nelson of The Verge praised series directors Mark Hudis and Barry Sonnenfeld for basing the series closely on the original novels; writing that the third season "is a masterclass in how to build a faithful adaptation, and how to see it to the end gracefully". Similarly, Petrana Radulovic praised the series for its faithfulness to the source material and for "balancing absurd humor with deeper questions of morality".

Rohan Naahar of the Hindustan Times awarded the season 4/5 stars, writing "that Netflix's most lavish and underrated original ends on a satisfying note". He praised Neil Patrick Harris's performance as Count Olaf as the "performance of a lifetime". Naahar also praised Patrick Warburton for his role as the "fourth wall-breaking" narrator Lemony Snicket. Akhil Arora of NDTV gave the season finale a mixed review, criticizing the show's adherence to the original novels and what he regarded as the ludicrous nature of the earlier episodes' adventures. However, he praised the series' latter episodes for exploring deeper themes such as morality, the blurred lines between nobility and wickedness, and moral gray areas.

Gabriel Bergmoser of Den of Geek UK praised the series as a "rare adaptation that complements, respects, and gently reconfigures its source material". However, he opined that the series' happy ending in contrast to the ambiguous ending in the novels would create contention among fans. Ryan Grow of the San Diego Entertainer Magazine described the third season as the "best and most exciting in the series", awarding it 4.5 out of five stars. He praised the richly-layered characters for enabling the main cast to deliver "emotionally believable performances".

Awards and nominations

Notes

References

External links 

 
 

2010s American black comedy television series
2010s American children's television series
2010s American comedy-drama television series
2010s American mystery television series
2017 American television series debuts
2019 American television series endings
A Series of Unfortunate Events
English-language Netflix original programming
Television shows based on American novels
Television series about children
Television series about orphans
Television shows filmed in Vancouver
Television series by Paramount Television
Television series reboots